Limerick County Council was the authority responsible for local government in County Limerick, Ireland. As a county council, it was governed by the Local Government Act 2001. The council had 28 elected members. Elections for the council were held every five years and were by single transferable vote. The head of the council had the title of Cathaoirleach (Chairperson).

The county council was originally based at Limerick Courthouse and then moved to County Buildings in O'Connell Street in two stages; Nos. 82 and 83 were acquired in 1911 and Nos. 80 and 81 in 1966. The county council then moved to County Hall, Dooradoyle in 2003. Limerick County Council was also responsible for a large proportion of Limerick city's suburbs. The remaining areas of Limerick city were under the authority of Limerick City Council which was a separate authority. It was abolished in 2014 when the Local Government Reform Act 2014 was implemented. It was succeeded by Limerick City and County Council.

For the purpose of elections the county was divided into five local electoral areas: Adare (7), Castleconnell (7), Kilmallock (5), Newcastle (5) and Rathkeale (4).

Merger with Limerick City Council
On 28 June 2011, the Minister for the Environment, Community and Local Government Phil Hogan announced that Limerick City Council and Limerick County Council would be merged into a single local authority. The merger would come into effect following the 2014 local elections. The new entity would be headed by a directly elected mayor, with a five-year term. The first steps in this merger was the appointment of Conn Murray as the dual manager of both Limerick City Council and Limerick County Council. The merger came into effect on 1 June 2014.

References

Politics of County Limerick
Former local authorities in the Republic of Ireland
2014 disestablishments in Ireland